Padlocked is a 1926 American silent drama film directed by Allan Dwan and written by Rex Beach, Becky Gardiner, and James Shelley Hamilton. The film stars Lois Moran, Noah Beery Sr., Louise Dresser, Helen Jerome Eddy, Allan Simpson, Florence Turner, and Richard Arlen. The film was released on August 2, 1926, by Paramount Pictures.

Cast

Preservation status
A surviving print of Padlocked is in a foreign archive, the Narodni Film Archive.

References

External links

1926 films
1920s English-language films
Silent American drama films
1926 drama films
Paramount Pictures films
Films directed by Allan Dwan
American black-and-white films
American silent feature films
Films based on works by Rex Beach
1920s American films